Palappuram is a neighbourhood in Ottapalam located 4 km from Ottapalam, between Shornur and the Palakkad Highway in Kerala, South India. In olden days most of the were farmers and weavers. There are various temple in this village. Chinakkathur Kavu, Mariyamman temple, NeeliKavu, and Sree Kurumba kavu.

Temples
Palappuram is noted for the famous Chinakkathur Temple festival (known as Chinakkathur pooram) held every year during March/April.

History
Palappuram is a part of old Nedunga nadukingdom. Place is famous for the Chinakkathoor Pooram (annual  Hindu festival) held at the famous Chinakkattoorkkavu Temple of Goddess Durga. There is a huge local and global crowd who come here to see the Pooram festival. The pooram is  accompanied by Elephants and the traditional Melam. Huge man made Horses (Kuthira) made out of straw, paper and cloth are the special attraction of this festival. It is unique in the sense that nowhere else Poorams has these Horses.

Places of worship
Palappuram has a famous Mariamman Temple of Goddess. There is a huge local and other state crowd comes here to perceive the Mariamman Festival which would happen once in 4 years. The people of Palappuram would celebrate this festival for one week. Each day has a unique pooja and programs and the last day is "majnaneerattu". People from different part of Kerala and Tamil Nadu would participate in this festival.

Palappuram has its post office situated near the NSS College Bus stop. Other notable institutions include the GJBS School, Padnharrakara  Aided Junior Basic School (AJB School located at the 19th mile bus stop), Mariyamman temple, St. Mary's Church, Mosques, Someswaram Siva Temple, Dakshinamoorthy Temple etc. The Someswaram temple is believed to be the one among the 108 Shiva temples established by Parasurama, the mythological character. The place is located in the banks of Bharathapuzha. Ottapalam is the major town nearby. Palappuram has a surviving traditional weaving industry.

Education
It is also famous for its educational institutions like the NSS College, a  Kendriya Vidyalaya (Central School) and a Steel foundry unit run by Steel Industries Limited Kerala (SILK) at Kairampara junction. Palappuram has been famous for some time for Ayurveda Medical treatment.
The staff residence quarter's for the government Postal department and BSNL, the government-run telecom company, are also located here.

The country's first defence park was declared to be established at the KINFRA Industrial park at Palappuram - Ottapalam.

Schools
  Kendriya Vidyalaya
  Government Junior Basic School
  Aided Junior Basic School
  Lakshmi Narayana Vidyaniketan
  Padinharkkara Junior Basic School

Colleges
 N.S.S. College, Palappuram.
 N.S.S. Training College, Palappuram.
 Lakshmi Narayana College.

Hospitals
Padinharkkara Ayurveda Hospital And Research Center(P.A.H.R.C.),
ESI Hospital Palappuram

Transportation
Palappuram town connects to other parts of India through Palakkad city.  National Highway No.544 connects to Coimbatore and Bangalore.  Other parts of Kerala is accessed through National Highway No.66 going through Thrissur.  Calicut International Airport, Cochin International Airport and Coimbatore Airport  are the nearest airports. Shoranur Junction railway station is the nearest major railway station.

External links

puppet play at Chinakkathur
Travelogue of British tourists visiting the Pooram
Amateur(Ham) Radio station at Palappuram  
SILK foundry unit being modernised   
Ottapalam to get Defence Park
 

Cities and towns in Palakkad district
Ottapalam